Petit-Saguenay is a municipality in the Canadian province of Quebec, located in Le Fjord-du-Saguenay Regional County Municipality. The municipality, located on Route 170 near L'Anse-Saint-Jean, had a population of 727 in the Canada 2011 Census, which dropped to 634 in the 2016 census.

References

External links

Municipalities in Quebec
Incorporated places in Saguenay–Lac-Saint-Jean
Canada geography articles needing translation from French Wikipedia